The 2019 Italian regional elections took place in five regions of Italy during 2019: Abruzzo (10 February), Sardinia (24 February), Basilicata (24 March), Piedmont (26 May) and Umbria (27 October).

Overall results

Regional councils

Presidents of the regions

Results by region

Abruzzo

Sardinia

Basilicata

Piedmont

Umbria

Elections in Italian regions
2019 elections in Italy
February 2019 events in Italy
March 2019 events in Italy
May 2019 events in Italy
October 2019 events in Italy